Wakendorf may refer to:

Wakendorf I, a German municipality in the district of Segeberg, in Schleswig-Holstein.
Wakendorf II, a German municipality in the district of Segeberg, in Schleswig-Holstein.